Generation 1000 Euros (also known as The 1000 Euros Generation and Generazione mille euro) is a 2009 Italian comedy film written and directed by Massimo Venier. It is loosely based on a novel with the same name written by Antonio Incorvaia and Alessandro Rimassa.

The film received two nominations at Nastri d'Argento Awards,  for best comedy film and for best supporting actress (Valentina Lodovini).

The film was released on April 24, 2009.

Cast   
Alessandro Tiberi as Matte
Carolina Crescentini  as Angelica
Valentina Lodovini  as Beatrice
 Francesco Mandelli as Francesco 
Francesca Inaudi  as Valentina
Paolo Villaggio  as The Professor 
 Francesco Brandi as Faustino
 Steffan Boje as Mark Winterbottom
Roberto Citran  as Tassista
 Natalino Balasso as Landolfi

See also    
 List of Italian films of 2009

References

External links

Films directed by Massimo Venier
Italian comedy films
2009 comedy films
2009 films